Wim Kos (8 February 1904 – 8 March 1930) was a Dutch speed skater. He competed in three events at the 1928 Winter Olympics.

References

External links
 

1904 births
1930 deaths
Dutch male speed skaters
Olympic speed skaters of the Netherlands
Speed skaters at the 1928 Winter Olympics
People from Langedijk
Sportspeople from North Holland